Brontosaurus (meaning "thunder lizard" from Greek ,  "thunder" and ,  "lizard") is a genus of gigantic quadruped sauropod dinosaurs. Although the type species, B. excelsus, had long been considered a species of the closely related Apatosaurus and therefore invalid, researchers proposed in 2015 that Brontosaurus is a genus separate from Apatosaurus and that it contains three species: B. excelsus, B. yahnahpin, and B. parvus.

Brontosaurus had a long, thin neck and a small head adapted for a herbivorous lifestyle, a bulky, heavy torso, and a long, whip-like tail. The various species lived during the Late Jurassic epoch, in the Morrison Formation of what is now North America, and were extinct by the end of the Jurassic.

As the archetypal sauropod, Brontosaurus is one of the best-known dinosaurs and has been featured in film, advertising, and postage stamps, as well as many other types of media.

History of discovery

Initial discovery and the Felch Quarry skull 
In 1879, Othniel Charles Marsh, a professor of paleontology at Yale University, announced the discovery of a large and fairly complete sauropod skeleton collected from Morrison Formation rocks at Como Bluff, Wyoming by William Harlow Reed. He identified it as belonging to an entirely new genus and species, which he named Brontosaurus excelsus,
 meaning "thunder lizard", from the Greek / meaning "thunder" and / meaning "lizard", and from the Latin excelsus, "noble" or "high". By this time, the Morrison Formation had become the center of the Bone Wars, a fossil-collecting rivalry between Marsh and another early paleontologist, Edward Drinker Cope. Because of this, the publications and descriptions of taxa by Marsh and Cope were rushed at the time. Brontosaurus excelsus type specimen (YPM 1980) was one of the most complete sauropod skeletons known at the time, preserving many of the characteristic but fragile cervical vertebrae.  Marsh believed that Brontosaurus was a member of the Atlantosauridae, a clade of sauropod dinosaurs named by him in 1877 that also comprised Atlantosaurus and Apatosaurus.

A year later in 1880, another partial postcranial Brontosaurus skeleton was collected in Como Bluff by Reed, including well preserved limb elements. Marsh named this second skeleton Brontosaurus amplus ("large thunder lizard") in 1881, but it was considered a synonym of B. excelsus in 2015. 

Further south in Felch Quarry at Garden Park, Colorado, Marshall P. Felch collected a disarticulated partial skull (USNM V 5730) of a sauropod in August 1883 and sent the specimen to Yale. Marsh referred the skull to B. excelsus, later featuring it in a skeletal reconstruction of the B. excelsus type specimen in 1891 and the illustration was featured again in Marsh's landmark publication, The Dinosaurs of North America, in 1896. At the Yale Peabody Museum, the skeleton of Brontosaurus excelsus was mounted in 1931 with a skull based on the Marsh reconstruction of the Felch Quarry skull. While at the time most museums were using Camarasaurus casts for skulls, the Peabody Museum sculpted a completely different skull based on Marsh's recon. The skull also included forward-pointing nasals, something truly different to any dinosaur, and fenestrae differing from the drawing and other skulls, and the mandible was based on a Camarasaurus'. In 1998, the Felch Quarry skull that Marsh included in his 1896 skeletal restoration was suggested to belong to Brachiosaurus instead and this was supported in 2020 with a redescription of the Brachiosaurid material found at Felch Quarry.

Second Dinosaur Rush and skull issue 

During a Carnegie Museum expedition in 1901 to Wyoming, William Harlow Reed collected another Brontosaurus skeleton, a partial postcranial skeleton of a young juvenile (CM 566), including partial limbs, intermingled with a fairly complete skeleton of an adult (UW 15556). The adult skeleton specifically was very well preserved, bearing many cervical and caudal vertebrae, and is the most complete definite specimen of Brontosaurus parvus. The skeletons were granted a new genus and species name, Elosaurus parvus ("little field lizard"), by Olof A. Peterson and Charles Gilmore in 1902. Both of the specimens came from the Brushy Basin Member of the Morrison Formation. The species was later transferred to Apatosaurus by several authors until it was placed in Brontosaurus in 2015 by Tschopp et al.

Elmer Riggs, in the 1903 edition of Geological Series of the Field Columbian Museum, argued that Brontosaurus was not different enough from Apatosaurus to warrant its own genus, so he created the new combination Apatosaurus excelsus for it. Riggs stated that "In view of these facts the two genera may be regarded as synonymous. As the term 'Apatosaurus' has priority, 'Brontosaurus' will be regarded as a synonym". Nonetheless, before the mounting of the American Museum of Natural History specimen, Henry Fairfield Osborn chose to label the skeleton "Brontosaurus", though he was a strong opponent of Marsh and his taxa.

In 1905, the American Museum of Natural History (AMNH) unveiled the first-ever mounted skeleton of a sauropod, a composite specimen (mainly made of bones from AMNH 460) that they referred to as the species Brontosaurus excelsus. The AMNH specimen was very complete, only missing the feet (feet from the specimen AMNH 592 were added to the mount), lower leg, and shoulder bones (added from AMNH 222), and tail bones (added from AMNH 339). To complete the mount, the rest of the tail was fashioned to appear as Marsh believed it should, which had too few vertebrae. In addition, a sculpted model of what the museum felt the skull of this massive creature might look like was placed on the skeleton. This was not a delicate skull like that of Diplodocus, which would later turn out to be more accurate, but was based on "the biggest, thickest, strongest skull bones, lower jaws and tooth crowns from three different quarries". These skulls were likely those of Camarasaurus, the only other sauropod for which good skull material was known at the time. The mount construction was overseen by Adam Hermann, who failed to find Brontosaurus skulls. Hermann was forced to sculpt a stand-in skull by hand. Henry Fairfield Osborn noted in a publication that the skull was "largely conjectural and based on that of Morosaurus" (now Camarasaurus).

In 1909, an Apatosaurus skull was found, during the first expedition to what would become the Carnegie Quarry at Dinosaur National Monument, led by Earl Douglass. The skull was found a few meters away from a skeleton (specimen CM 3018) identified as the new species Apatosaurus louisae. The skull was designated CM 11162, and was very similar to the skull of Diplodocus. It was accepted as belonging to the Apatosaurus specimen by Douglass and Carnegie Museum director William H. Holland, although other scientists, most notably Osborn, rejected this identification. Holland defended his view in 1914 in an address to the Paleontological Society of America, yet he left the Carnegie Museum mount headless. While some thought Holland was attempting to avoid conflict with Osborn, others suspected that Holland was waiting until an articulated skull and neck were found to confirm the association of the skull and skeleton. After Holland's death in 1934, a cast of a Camarasaurus skull was placed on the mount by museum staff.

Skull correction, resurgent discoveries, and reassessment 
No apatosaurine skull was mentioned in literature until the 1970s, when John Stanton McIntosh and David Berman redescribed the skulls of Diplodocus and Apatosaurus in 1975. They found that though he never published his opinion, Holland was almost certainly correct, that Apatosaurus (and Brontosaurus) had a Diplodocus-like skull. According to them, many skulls long thought to pertain to Diplodocus might instead be those of Apatosaurus. They reassigned multiple skulls to Apatosaurus based on associated and closely associated vertebrae. Though they supported Holland, Apatosaurus was noted to possibly have possessed a Camarasaurus-like skull, based on a disarticulated Camarasaurus-like tooth found at the precise site where an Apatosaurus specimen was found years before. On October 20, 1979, after the publications by McIntosh and Berman, the first skull of an Apatosaurus was mounted on a skeleton in a museum, that of the Carnegie. In 1995, the American Museum of Natural History followed suit, and unveiled their remounted skeleton (now labelled Apatosaurus excelsus) with a corrected tail and a new skull cast from A. louisae. In 1998, Robert T. Bakker referred a skull and mandible of an Apatosaurine from Como Bluff to Brontosaurus excelsus (TATE 099-01), though the skull is still undescribed. In 2011, the first specimen of Apatosaurus where a skull was found articulated with its cervical vertebrae was described. This specimen, CMC VP 7180, was found to differ in both skull and neck features from A. louisae, and the specimen was found to have a majority of features related to those of A. ajax.
 
Another specimen of an Apatosaurine now referred to Brontosaurus was discovered in 1993 by the Tate Geological Museum, also from the Morrison Formation of central Wyoming. The specimen consisted of a partial postcranial skeleton, including a complete manus and many vertebrae, and described by James Filla and Pat Redman a year later. Filla and Redman named the specimen Apatosaurus yahnahpin ("yahnahpin-wearing deceptive lizard"), but Robert T. Bakker gave it the genus name Eobrontosaurus in 1998. Bakker believed that Eobrontosaurus was the direct predecessor to Brontosaurus, although later Tschopp et al.'s phylogenetic analysis placed B. yahnahpin as the basalmost species of Brontosaurus.

In 2008, a nearly complete postcranial skeleton of an Apatosaurine was collected in Utah by crews working for Brigham Young University (BYU 1252-18531) where some of the remains are currently on display. The skeleton is undescribed, but many of the features of the skeleton are shared with Brontosaurus parvus.

Almost all 20th-century paleontologists agreed with Riggs that all Apatosaurus and Brontosaurus species should be classified in a single genus. According to the rules of the ICZN (which governs the scientific names of animals), the name Apatosaurus, having been published first, had priority as the official name; Brontosaurus was considered a junior synonym and was therefore discarded from formal use. Despite this, at least one paleontologist—Robert T. Bakker—argued in the 1990s that A. ajax and A. excelsus are in fact sufficiently distinct that the latter continues to merit a separate genus. In 2015, an extensive study of diplodocid relationships by Emanuel Tschopp, Octavio Mateus, and Roger Benson concluded that Brontosaurus was indeed a valid genus of sauropod distinct from Apatosaurus. The scientists developed a statistical method to more objectively assess differences between fossil genera and species, and concluded that Brontosaurus could be "resurrected" as a valid name. They assigned two former Apatosaurus species, A. parvus and A. yahnahpin, to Brontosaurus, as well as the type species B. excelsus. Paleontologist Michael D'Emic made a critique. Paleontologist Donald Prothero criticized the mass media reaction to this study as superficial and premature.

Description

Brontosaurus was a large, long-necked, quadrupedal animal with a long, whip-like tail, and forelimbs that were slightly shorter than its hindlimbs.

The skull of Brontosaurus has not been found, but was probably similar to the skull of the closely related Apatosaurus. Like those of other sauropods, the vertebrae of the neck were deeply bifurcated; that is, they carried paired spines, resulting in a wide and deep neck. The spine and tail consisted of 15 cervicals, ten dorsals, five sacrals, and about 82 caudals. The number of caudal vertebrae was noted to vary, even within a species. The cervical vertebrae were stouter than other diplodocids, though not as stout as in mature specimens of Apatosaurus. The dorsal ribs are not fused or tightly attached to their vertebrae, instead being loosely articulated. Ten dorsal ribs are on either side of the body. The large neck was filled with an extensive system of weight-saving air sacs. Brontosaurus, like its close relative Apatosaurus, had tall spines on its vertebrae, which made up more than half the height of the individual bones. The shape of the tail was unusual for diplodocids, being comparatively slender, due to the vertebral spines rapidly decreasing in height the farther they are from the hips. Brontosaurus spp. also had very long ribs compared to most other diplodocids, giving them unusually deep chests. As in other diplodocids, the last portion of the tail of Brontosaurus possessed a whip-like structure.

The limb bones were also very robust. The arm bones are stout, with the humerus resembling that of Camarasaurus, and those of B. excelsus being nearly identical to those of Apatosaurus ajax. Charles Gilmore in 1936 noted that previous reconstructions erroneously proposed that the radius and ulna could cross, when in life they would have remained parallel. Brontosaurus had a single large claw on each forelimb, and the first three toes possessed claws on each foot. Even by 1936, it was recognized that no sauropod had more than one hand claw preserved, and this one claw is now accepted as the maximum number throughout the entire group. The single front claw bone is slightly curved and squarely shortened on the front end. The hip bones included robust ilia and the fused pubes and ischia. The tibia and fibula bones of the lower leg were different from the slender bones of Diplodocus, but nearly indistinguishable from those of Camarasaurus. The fibula is longer than the tibia, although it is also more slender.

Classification
Brontosaurus is a member of the family Diplodocidae, a clade of gigantic sauropod dinosaurs. The family includes some of the longest and largest creatures ever to walk the earth, including Diplodocus, Supersaurus, and Barosaurus. Brontosaurus is also classified in the subfamily Apatosaurinae, which also includes Apatosaurus and one or more possible unnamed genera. Othniel Charles Marsh described Brontosaurus as being allied to Atlantosaurus, within the now defunct group Atlantosauridae. In 1878, Marsh raised his family to the rank of suborder, including Apatosaurus, Brontosaurus, Atlantosaurus, Morosaurus (=Camarasaurus), and Diplodocus. He classified this group within Sauropoda. In 1903, Elmer S. Riggs mentioned that the name Sauropoda would be a junior synonym of earlier names, and grouped Apatosaurus within Opisthocoelia. Most authors still use Sauropoda as the group name.
 
Originally named by its discoverer Othniel Charles Marsh in 1879, Brontosaurus had long been considered a junior synonym of Apatosaurus; its type species, Brontosaurus excelsus, was reclassified as A. excelsus in 1903. However, an extensive study published in 2015 by a joint British-Portuguese research team concluded that Brontosaurus was a valid genus of sauropod distinct from Apatosaurus. Nevertheless, not all paleontologists agree with this division. The same study classified two additional species that had once been considered Apatosaurus and Eobrontosaurus as Brontosaurus parvus and Brontosaurus yahnahpin respectively. 

Cladogram of the Diplodocidae after Tschopp, Mateus, and Benson (2015):

Species
 Brontosaurus excelsus, the type species of Brontosaurus, was first named by Marsh in 1879. Many specimens, including the holotype specimen YPM 1980, have been assigned to the species. They include FMNH P25112, the skeleton mounted at the Field Museum of Natural History, which has since been found to represent an unknown species of apatosaurine. Brontosaurus amplus, occasionally assigned to B. parvus, is a junior synonym of B. excelsus. B. excelsus therefore only includes its type specimen and the type specimen of B. amplus. Both known definitive B. excelsus fossils have been reported from Reed's Quarry 10 of the Morrison Formation Brushy Basin member in Albany County, Wyoming, dated to the late Kimmeridgian age, about 152 million years ago.
  Brontosaurus parvus, first described as Elosaurus in 1902 by Peterson and Gilmore, was reassigned to Apatosaurus in 1994, and to Brontosaurus in 2015. Specimens assigned to this species include the holotype, CM 566 (a partial skeleton of a juvenile found in Sheep Creek Quarry 4 in Albany County, WY), BYU 1252-18531 (a nearly complete skeleton found in Utah and mounted at Brigham Young University), and the partial skeleton UW 15556 (which had once been accidentally mixed together with the holotype). It dates to the middle Kimmeridgian.
Brontosaurus yahnahpin is the oldest species, known from a single site from the lower Morrison Formation, Bertha Quarry, in Albany County, Wyoming, dating to about 155 million years ago. The type species, E. yahnahpin, was described by James Filla and Patrick Redman in 1994 as a species of Apatosaurus (A. yahnahpin). The specific name is derived from Lakota mah-koo yah-nah-pin, "breast necklace", a reference to the pairs of sternal ribs that resemble the hair pipes traditionally worn by the tribe. The holotype specimen is TATE-001, a relatively complete postcranial skeleton found in Wyoming, in the lower Morrison Formation. More fragmentary remains have also been referred to the species. A re-evaluation by Robert T. Bakker in 1998 found it to be more primitive, so Bakker coined the new generic name Eobrontosaurus, derived from Greek , "dawn", and Brontosaurus.

The cladogram below is the result of an analysis by Tschopp, Mateus, and Benson (2015). The authors analyzed most diplodocid type specimens separately to deduce which specimen belonged to which species and genus.

Palaeobiology

Posture and locomotion

 
Historically, sauropods like Brontosaurus were believed to be too massive to support their own weight on dry land, so theoretically they must have lived partly submerged in water, perhaps in swamps. Recent findings do not support this, and sauropods are thought to have been fully terrestrial animals.

Diplodocids like Brontosaurus are often portrayed with their necks held high up in the air, allowing them to browse on tall trees. Though some studies have suggested that diplodocid necks were less flexible than previously believed, other studies have found that all tetrapods appear to hold their necks at the maximum possible vertical extension when in a normal, alert posture, and argue that the same would hold true for sauropods barring any unknown, unique characteristics that set the soft tissue anatomy of their necks apart from that of other animals.

The slow locomotion of sauropods may be due to the minimal muscling or recoil after strides.

Various uses have been proposed for the single claw on the forelimb of sauropods. They were suggested to have been for defence, but the shape and size of them makes this unlikely. Other predictions were that it could be for feeding, but the most probable is that the claw was for grasping objects like tree trunks when rearing.

Physiology

James Spotila et al. (1991) suggest that the large body size of Brontosaurus and other sauropods would have made them unable to maintain high metabolic rates, as they would not be able to release enough heat. However, temperatures in the Jurassic were 3 degrees Celsius higher than present. They assumed that the animals had a reptilian respiratory system. Wedel found that an avian system would have allowed them to dump more heat. Some scientists have argued that the heart would have had trouble sustaining sufficient blood pressure to oxygenate the brain.

Juveniles
 
Juvenile Brontosaurus material is known based on the type specimen of B. parvus. The material of this specimen, CM 566, includes vertebrae from various regions, one pelvic bone, and some bones of the hindlimb.

Tail
An article that appeared in the November 1997 issue of Discover magazine reported research into the mechanics of diplodocid tails by Nathan Myhrvold, a computer scientist from Microsoft. Myhrvold carried out a computer simulation of the tail, which in diplodocids like Brontosaurus was a very long, tapering structure resembling a bullwhip. This computer modeling suggested that sauropods were capable of producing a whip-like cracking sound of over 200 decibels, comparable to the volume of a cannon. There is some circumstantial evidence supporting this as well: a number of diplodocids have been found with fused or damaged tail vertebrae, which may be a symptom of cracking their tails: these are particularly common between the 18th and the 25th caudal vertebra, a region the authors consider a transitional zone between the stiff muscular base and the flexible whiplike section. However, Rega (2012) notes that Camarasaurus, while lacking a tailwhip, displays a similar level of caudal co-ossification, and that Mamenchisaurus, while having the same pattern of vertebral metrics, lacks a tailwhip and does not display fusion in any "transitional region". Also, the crush fractures which would be expected if the tail was used as a whip have never been found in diplodocids. More recently, Baron (2020) considers the use of the tail as a bullwhip unlikely because of the potentially catastrophic muscle and skeletal damage such speeds could cause on the large and heavy tail. Instead, he proposes that the tails might have been used as a tactile organ to keep in touch with the individuals behind and on the sides in a group while migrating, which could have augmented cohesion and allowed communication among individuals while limiting more energetically demanding activities like stopping to search for dispersed individuals, turning to visually check on individuals behind, or communicating vocally.

Paleoecology

The Morrison Formation is a sequence of shallow marine and alluvial sediments which, according to radiometric dating, ranges between 156.3 million years old (Mya) at its base, and 146.8 Mya at the top, which places it in the late Oxfordian, Kimmeridgian, and early Tithonian stages of the Late Jurassic period. This formation is interpreted as a semiarid environment with distinct wet and dry seasons. The Morrison Basin, where dinosaurs lived, stretched from New Mexico to Alberta and Saskatchewan, and was formed when the precursors to the Front Range of the Rocky Mountains started pushing up to the west. The deposits from their east-facing drainage basins were carried by streams and rivers and deposited in swampy lowlands, lakes, river channels, and floodplains. This formation is similar in age to the Lourinha Formation in Portugal and the Tendaguru Formation in Tanzania.

Brontosaurus may have been a more solitary animal than other Morrison Formation dinosaurs. As a genus, Brontosaurus existed for a long span of time, and have been found in most levels of the Morrison. B. excelsus fossils have been reported from the upper Salt Wash Member to the upper Brushy Basin Member, ranging from the middle to late Kimmeridgian age, about 154–151 Mya. Additional remains are known from even younger rocks, but they have not been identified as any particular species. Older Brontosaurus remains have also been identified from the middle Kimmeridgian, and are assigned to B. parvus. Fossils of these animals have been found in Nine Mile Quarry and Bone Cabin Quarry in Wyoming and at sites in Colorado, Oklahoma, and Utah, present in stratigraphic zones 2–6.

The Morrison Formation records an environment and time dominated by gigantic sauropod dinosaurs. Dinosaurs known from the Morrison include the theropods Ceratosaurus, Ornitholestes, and Allosaurus, the sauropods Apatosaurus, Brachiosaurus, Camarasaurus, and Diplodocus, and the ornithischians Camptosaurus, Dryosaurus, and Stegosaurus. Other vertebrates that shared this paleoenvironment included ray-finned fishes, frogs, salamanders, turtles, sphenodonts, lizards, terrestrial and aquatic crocodylomorphs, and several species of pterosaurs. Shells of bivalves and aquatic snails are also common. The flora of the period has been revealed by fossils of green algae, fungi, mosses, horsetails, cycads, ginkgoes, and several families of conifers. Vegetation varied from river-lining forests of tree ferns, and ferns (gallery forests), to fern savannas with occasional trees such as the Araucaria-like conifer Brachyphyllum.

In popular culture

The length of time taken for Riggs's 1903 reclassification of Brontosaurus as Apatosaurus to be brought to public notice, as well as Osborn's insistence that the Brontosaurus name be retained despite Riggs's paper, meant that Brontosaurus became one of the most famous dinosaurs. Brontosaurus has often been depicted in cinema, beginning with Winsor McCay's 1914 classic Gertie the Dinosaur, one of the first animated films. McCay based his unidentified dinosaur on the apatosaurine skeleton in the American Museum of Natural History. The 1925 silent film The Lost World featured a battle between a Brontosaurus and an Allosaurus, using special effects by Willis O'Brien. The 1933 film King Kong featured a Brontosaurus chasing Carl Denham, Jack Driscoll and the terrified sailors on Skull Island. These, and other early uses of the animal as major representative of the group, helped cement Brontosaurus as a quintessential dinosaur in the public consciousness.

Sinclair Oil Corporation has long been a fixture of American roads (and briefly in other countries) with its green dinosaur logo and mascot, a Brontosaurus. While Sinclair's early advertising included a number of different dinosaurs, eventually only Brontosaurus was used as the official logo, due to its popular appeal.

As late as 1989, the U.S. Postal Service caused controversy when it issued four "dinosaur" stamps: Tyrannosaurus, Stegosaurus, Pteranodon, and Brontosaurus. The use of the term Brontosaurus in place of Apatosaurus led to complaints of "fostering scientific illiteracy." The Postal Service defended itself (in Postal Bulletin 21744) by saying, "Although now recognized by the scientific community as Apatosaurus, the name Brontosaurus was used for the stamp because it is more familiar to the general population." Indeed, the Postal Service even implicitly rebuked the somewhat inconsistent complaints by adding that "[s]imilarly, the term 'dinosaur' has been used generically to describe all the animals [i.e., all four of the animals represented in the given stamp set], even though the Pteranodon was a flying reptile [rather than a true 'dinosaur']," a distinction left unmentioned in the numerous correspondence regarding the Brontosaurus/Apatosaurus issue. Palaeontologist Stephen Jay Gould supported this position. In the essay from which the title of the collection Bully for Brontosaurus is taken, Gould wrote: "Touché and right on; no one bitched about Pteranodon, and that's a real error." His position, however, was not one suggesting the exclusive use of the popular name; he echoed Riggs' original argument that Brontosaurus is a synonym for Apatosaurus. Nevertheless, he noted that the former has developed and continues to maintain an independent existence in the popular imagination.

The more vociferous denunciations of the usage have elicited sharply defensive statements from those who would not wish to see the name be struck from official usage. Tschopp's study has generated a very high number of responses from many, often opposed, groups – of editorial, news staff, and personal blog nature (both related and not), from both sides of the debate, from related and unrelated contexts, and from all over the world.

References

External links
 
 
 Is Brontosaurus Back? (Youtube video, 11 minutes, 2015)

Apatosaurinae
Articles containing video clips
Controversial dinosaur taxa
Dinosaurs of the Morrison Formation
Fossil taxa described in 1879
Late Jurassic dinosaurs of North America
Paleontology in Utah
Paleontology in Wyoming
Taxa named by Othniel Charles Marsh